World Downfall is the debut album by American grindcore band Terrorizer. It was released by Earache Records on November 13, 1989.

Background

World Downfall is regarded as one of the most influential grindcore albums ever: it showcases crunchy, heavily distorted guitar riffs and extremely fast and precise blast beats in addition to growling, harsh vocals and lyrics dealing with social issues, features that would become a standard among grindcore music. The cover art, which is similar to Napalm Death's Scum, is a collage featuring scenes of war, political figures, a nuclear power plant, and Jesus rising. About a third of the songs were actually Nausea material, the previous band of vocalist Oscar Garcia. The album was released in 1989 when the band had already split up, with Jesse Pintado joining Napalm Death, and Pete Sandoval joining Morbid Angel. David Vincent was not an original member of Terrorizer but filled in on bass due to his connection to Sandoval in Morbid Angel, because their original bassist Alfred "Garvey" Estrada was in jail at the time.

The song "Fear of Napalm" was featured in the video game Grand Theft Auto IV: The Lost and Damned, and the song "Dead Shall Rise" was on the soundtrack for the video game Splatterhouse.

Track listing

Personnel
Oscar Garcia - lead vocals
Jesse Pintado - guitars
David Vincent - bass, backing vocals, production
Pete Sandoval - drums
Scott Burns - engineering

References

1989 debut albums
Terrorizer albums
Earache Records albums